Oradea is a city in Romania, located in Crișana, a sub-region of Transylvania. The seat of Bihor County, Oradea is one of the most important economic, social and cultural centers in the western part of Romania. The city is located in the north-west of the country, nestled between hills on the Crișana plain, on the banks of the river Crișul Repede, that divides the city into almost equal halves.

Oradea enjoys a high standard of living and ranks among the most livable cities in the country. The city is also a strong industrial center in the region, hosting some of Romania's largest companies. Besides its status as an economic hub, Oradea boasts a rich Art Nouveau architectural heritage and is a member of the Réseau Art Nouveau Network and the Art Nouveau European Route.

Name
The Romanian name Oradea originates from the city's Hungarian name. In Hungarian, it is called Nagyvárad, or colloquially Várad, the latter being the origin of the Romanian name.

"Nagy" means great or large in Hungarian, and it helped to differentiate the town from Kisvárda, a town in Hungary, with "kis" meaning little. "Vár" means castle or citadel, and "-ad" is a suffix used for settlement names.

The city also has a German name, Großwardein, as well as a Yiddish one derived from it, גרויסווארדיין Groysvardeyn. In Turkish, the city was historically known as Varat or Varad.
Other names include Latin Varadinum as well as the historical Italian name of Gran Varadino.

Some archaic Romanian names of the city are Oradia, Oradea Mare ("Great Oradea"), Varadia Mare ("Great Varadia") and Urbea Mare ("the Grand City").

Geography
The city lies at the meeting point of the Crișana plain and the Crișul Repede's basin. The main part of the settlement is situated on the floodplain and on the terraces situated down the river Crișul Repede. Oradea is famous for its thermal springs. The river Crișul Repede crosses the city right through the center, providing it with a picturesque beauty. Its flow depends on the season; the dykes near Tileagd have partly controlled it since they were built in the early 1980s.

Climate
Oradea has a warm-summer humid continental climate (Köppen climate classification Dfb) with oceanic influences. The city's topo-climatic action is determined by the prevailing Western winds. Summers are long and hot with cool nights. Winters are short and moderately cold.

Rainfall is variably distributed throughout the year, with a maximum in June and a minimum in the late Autumn and Winter months of the year.

History

While modern Oradea is first mentioned in 1113, under the Latin name "Varadinum" in a diploma belonging to Benedictine Zobor Abbey – Bishop Sixtus Varadiensis and Saul de Bychar are mentioned in the document – recent archaeological findings, in and around the city, provide evidence of a more or less continuous habitation since the Neolithic. The Dacians and Celts also inhabited the region. After the conquest of Dacia the Romans established a presence in the area, most notably in the Salca district of the city and modern day Băile Felix. According to the Gesta Hungarorum, a Hungarian chronicle written after 1150 by an unidentified author, referred to as Anonymus, the region was ruled by Menumorut at the end of the 9th and beginning of the 10th centuries, until the Hungarian land-taking. Its citadel was centred at Biharea. Historians debate whether Menumorut was a historical ruler or a legendary character. According to Anonymus, Menumorut's duchy was populated primarily with Khazars and Székelys, and he acknowledged the suzerainty of the (unnamed) ruling Byzantine Emperor at the time.

In the 11th century when St. King Ladislaus I of Hungary founded a bishopric settlement near the city of Oradea, the present Roman Catholic Diocese of Oradea. The city flourished both economically and culturally during the 13th century as part of the Kingdom of Hungary. It was at this time that the Citadel of Oradea, first mentioned in 1241 during the Mongol invasion, was first built. The fortress would be destroyed and rebuilt several times over the course of following centuries. The 14th and 15th centuries would prove to be of the most prosperous periods in the city's history up to that point. Many works of art would be added to the city, including: statues of Saints Stephen, Emeric, and Ladislaus (before 1372) and the equestrian sculpture of St. King Ladislaus I (1390) were erected in Oradea. The fabled statue of St. Ladislaus was the first proto-renaissance public square equestrian monument in Europe. Bishop Andreas Báthori (1329–1345) rebuilt the Cathedral in Gothic style. From that epoch dates also the Hermes, now preserved at Győr, which contains the skull of St. Ladislaus, and which is a masterpiece of the Hungarian goldsmith's art.

It was at this time that astronomer Georg von Peuerbach wrote his Tabula Varadiensis, published posthumously in 1464, at (?) the Observatory of Varadinum, establishing the city's observatory as the Earth's point of reference and prime meridian.

In 1474, the city was captured by the Turks after a protracted siege. Their mostly tolerant policies towards others peoples ensured that the city would become an ethnic mosaic of Romanians, Hungarians, Austrians, Slovaks, Ruthenians, and Turks, causing Oradea to grow as an urban area starting with the 16th century.

The Peace of Várad was concluded between Emperor Ferdinand I and John Zápolya here on 4 February 1538, in which they mutually recognized each other as legitimate monarchs. After the Ottoman invasion of Hungary, in the 16th century, the city became a constant point of contention between the Principality of Transylvania, the Ottoman Empire, and the Habsburg monarchy. After the 1570 Treaty of Speyer, parts of Crișana, including Oradea, became part of the newly formed Principality of Transylvania, a successor state of the Eastern Hungarian Kingdom.

The Ottomans laid siege to the city in 1598, however the siege failed. After the Treaty of Vienna (1606), the city was permanently incorporated in the Principality of Transylvania by imperial decree.

As a result of Gyorgy Rakoczi II's, at the time the Prince of Transylvania, failed attempt to gain the throne of Poland the Ottomans sent yet another punitive expedition against him and his Wallachian and Moldavian allies, Gheorghe Ștefan and Constantin Șerban. In 1660 the Ottomans, with a force of 45,000 men, besieged the city for the last time. The 850 defenders managed to hold out for 46 days, but eventually the city fell on 27 August due to internal treachery. The Ottomans designated the city as the capital of the newly formed Eyalet of Varat. The eyalet included the sanjaks of "Varat" (Oradea), Salanta, Debreçin, Halmaş, Sengevi, and Yapışmaz. The siege is described in detail by János Szalárdi in his contemporary chronicle. Ottoman dominance of the city ended in 1692, when, the Habsburg imperial forces conquered the city after a 14-month siege.

The city had been severely damaged by war, with only 114 houses left, of which only 21 had not been damaged. However, under the Habsburgs' reconstruction, in the 18th century, Oradea entered its golden age. The Viennese engineer Franz Anton Hillebrandt was given the task of planning the city in the Baroque style and, starting with the year 1752, many of the city's current landmarks were constructed such as the Roman Catholic Cathedral, the Moon Church, the State Theatre, and the Baroque Palace.

The city played a major role in the Hungarian Revolution of 1848, being the home of the largest Hungarian arms factory.

After World War I, Oradea passed under Romanian administration during the Hungarian–Romanian War of 1919, and became a part of the Kingdom of Romania under the Treaty of Trianon of 1920. In 1925, the status of municipality was given to Oradea, dissolving its former civic autonomy. Under the same ordinance, its name was changed from Oradea Mare ("Great" Oradea) to simply Oradea.

The Second Vienna Award brokered by Hitler and Mussolini in 1940 allowed Hungary to recover Northern Transylvania, including Oradea, and mass of celebrations welcomed the Hungarian administration. On 12 October 1944, Oradea was captured by Soviet troops of the 2nd Ukrainian Front in the course of the Battle of Debrecen, and reverted to Romanian administration in March 1945. After World War II, Hungary had to relinquish claims to it under the Treaty of Paris concluded on 10 February 1947.

After the Romanian Revolution of December 1989, Oradea aimed to achieve greater prosperity along with other towns in Romania. Both culturally and economically, Oradea's prospects are inevitably tied to the general aspirations of Romanian society to achieve freedom, democracy, and a free market economy. Due to its specific character, Oradea is one of the most important economic and cultural centers of Western Romania and of the country in general, and it is one of the great academic centers, with a unique bilingual dynamic.

Demographics

At the 2011 census Oradea had a population of 196,367, a decrease from the figure recorded at the 2002 census.

The ethnic makeup is as follows:

 Romanians: 132,718 (73.1%)
 Hungarians: 45,305 (24.9%)
 Roma: 2,132 (1.2%)
 Other: 1,507 (0.8%)

(Data refer to those for whom information on ethnicity is available. It is unavailable for 14,705 individuals or 7.5% of the city's population.)

The religious makeup is as follows: 59.8% Romanian Orthodox, 14.3% Reformed, 9.4% Roman Catholic, 5% Pentecostal, 3.7% Baptist, 3.4% Greek-Catholic and 4.4% other, undeclared or none.

Jewish community

This section incorporates text from the 1901–1906 Jewish Encyclopedia, a publication now in the public domain.

The chevra kadisha ("holy society") was founded in 1735, the first synagogue in 1803, and the first communal school in 1839.  Not until the beginning of the 19th century were Jews permitted to do business in any other part of the city, and even then they were required to return at nightfall to their own quarter. In 1835, permission was granted to live in any part of the city.

The Jewish community of Oradea became divided into Orthodox and Neolog congregations. While the members of the Neolog congregation still retained their membership in the chevra kadisha, they started to use a cemetery of their own in 1899. In the early 20th century, the Jews of Oradea had won prominence in the public life of the city. There were Jewish manufacturers, merchants, lawyers, physicians, and farmers; the chief of police (1902) was a Jew; and in the municipal council, the Jewish element was proportionately represented. The community possessed, in addition to the hospital and chevra kadisha, a Jewish women's association, a grammar school, a trade school for boys and girls, a yeshiva, a soup kitchen, etc.

According to the Center for Jewish Art:

The Oradea Jewish community was once the most active both commercially and culturally in the Austro-Hungarian Empire. In 1944, twenty-five thousand Oradean Jews were deported to concentration camps by the Nazis, thus decimating this vital community. Only three hundred Jews reside in Oradea today. In the center of the city, on the river bank and towering over other buildings in the area, is the large Neolog Temple Synagogue built in 1878. The unusual cube-shaped synagogue with its large cupola is one of the largest in Romania. Inside there is a large organ and stucco decorations. In 1891, the Orthodox community also built a complex of buildings including two synagogues and a community center.

In 1944, during the occupation of Hungary by Nazi Germany, Hungarian authorities forced the Jewish inhabitants into the Oradea ghetto before sending them to the Auschwitz concentration camp. Descendants of the pre-Holocaust hasidic rabbinate in Oradea established a synagogue in the Willowbrook area of Staten Island, New York City. The synagogue maintains both a traditional hasidic Nusach Sefard and a Nusach Ashkenaz service, the latter of which operates under the name Bais Medrash Igud Avreichim of Groisverdain (the Yiddish pronunciation of Grosswardein).

As of 2021, there is also a project to build a rabbinical seminary in Oradea.

Quarters

Before 1848, Oradea was made up of four separate towns: Várad-Újváros (Villa Nova, former Vicus Szombathely), Várad-Olaszi (Villa Latinorum Varadiensium, "olasz" meaning Italian), Várad-Velence (Vicus Venetia), Várad-Váralja (Civitas Waradiensis). The names Vicus Venetia, Villa Latinorum, Vicus Bolognia, Vicus Padua and others refer to the French, Walloons and Italian inhabitants who settled in the 13th century.

Today the city is made up of the following districts called quarters (cartiere in Romanian, negyedek in Hungarian):

 Calea Aradului
 Calea Sântandrei
 Orașul nou (city centre)
 Dacia – Decebal
 Dimitrie Cantemir
 Dragoș Vodă
 Dorobanților
 Eastern Industrial Zone
 Episcopia Bihor 
 Europa
 Gheorghe Doja
 Ioșia
 Ioșia Nord
 Ioșia Sud
 Mihai Eminescu
 Nicolae Grigorescu
 Nicolae Iorga
 Nufărul
 Olosig
 Oncea
 Podgoria
 Rogerius
 Salca
 Seleuș
 Splaiul Crișanei
 Subcetate
 Tokai
 Universității
 Velența
 Vie, also known as Podgoria
 Western Industrial Zone

Economy
Oradea has long been one of the more prosperous cities in Romania. The per capita GDP of Oradea is approximately 150% of the Romanian average. After 1989, due to its important base of consumers, Oradea enjoyed an economic renewal, not so much in industry, but rather, in the services sector such as trade and tourism.

Oradea has an unemployment rate of 6.0%, slightly lower than the Romanian average but much higher than Bihor County's average of around 2%. Oradea currently produces around 63% of the industrial production of Bihor County, while accounting for 34.5% of the population of the county. Its main industries are furniture, textiles and clothing, footwear, and food processing. Oradea's economy is sustained largely by small and medium business and the property taxes paid by citizens.

In the fiscal year 2012, Oradea had the largest budget in the Transylvania region, overcoming its neighbour cities, Arad and Cluj-Napoca. Some large Romanian companies, such as Adeplast, RCS-RDS, European Drinks, and FrigoExpress are located in Oradea.

Oradea is using geothermal electricity from water two kilometers below ground, which provides 7% of the energy for its district heating system. That system serves 70% of the city's population with heat and hot water.

Transport

The public transport network is run by OTL (Oradea Transport Local), a municipal agency. It is made up of five tram lines (1R, 1N, 2, 3R, 3N, 4N, 4R and the new 8) and 17 local bus lines (numbered from 10 to 26), and an international suburban one to Biharkeresztes, Hungary. The city has four train stations: , West, East, and Episcopia Bihor (Bihor Abbey). The West Station is located in the quarter of Ioșia, the Central station (called simply Oradea) is located closer to the city center, near the quarter of Vie, while the East station is located in Velența.

Oradea is served by Oradea International Airport, which has reopened at the end of 2015, after repairs to the runway.

Education

Oradea is one of the main education centers of Romania. The city is home to the University of Oradea, one of the largest universities in the country. There are also several private universities, one being Agora University, a modern academic institution founded in 2000. Emanuel University, an accredited private Baptist university, also exists in the city since 2002.

As of 2012, there had been 232 years since the inauguration of higher education in Oradea and 48 years of continuous higher education. A higher institution for philosophic teaching was founded in Oradea in 1780, which was to become in 1788 the Faculty of Law and was the oldest faculty within a vast region of Eastern Europe.

After 1921, all the courses at the Law Faculty were taught in Romanian. In 1923, the foundation of two theological academies gave new dimensions to the academic life in Oradea. The Law Academy of Oradea, together with the two theological academies, was to make another step forward by integrating a faculty of letters, thus achieving the old desideratum of creating a University of Crișana in Oradea.

After a thirty-year break in the activity of the Law Academy of Oradea, on 1 October 1963, an order of the Ministry of Education established in Oradea a 3-year Pedagogic Institute meant to do away with the scarcity of teachers in secondary education. The new institution of higher education began its activity with two faculties: Philology and Mathematics-Physics, and a year later other two faculties, History-Geography and Physical Education, were added.

In May 1990, a decree of the Romanian Government established the Technical University of Oradea, later called the University of Oradea, and based on impressive traditions of academic life in the town. It was an act of scientific and cultural restoration long expected in the life of the Romanian society, a major gain of the people's Revolution of December 1989, one of the greatest Romanian achievements in Crișana after the Great Union on 1 December 1918. This is how the dream of several generations of scholars came true, clearly expressed by a historian of Oradea: "As regarding the future, the desire of all well-meant Romanians is to establish in Oradea a complete university, the lights of which will shine across the entire western border of Romania". Today, the University of Oradea is an integrated institution of higher education of this kind, comprising 18 faculties.

The mission of the University of Oradea is to train and educate on a large scale both the students and also the high education graduates, as well as to approach certain domains of science and technology at high level.

The structure of the university contains academic education, postgraduate education, and scientific research. 

Research inside the University of Oradea is developing in the areas of natural and physical sciences, as well as in the area of social and human sciences, covering the following: Mathematics, Physics, Chemistry, Sciences of Life, Agricultural Sciences, Medical Sciences, Technological Sciences, Economical Sciences, Geography, History, Juridical Sciences and Law, Linguistics, Pedagogy, Political Sciences, Psychology, Letters and Arts, Sociology, Philosophy. The educational process is based on the curricula for long undergraduate and postgraduate studies.

One of the oldest private universities in Romania is also situated in Oradea. The Sulyok István Reform College was founded in the spring of 1990 by the Királyhágómelléki Reform Church. In 1999 the school became entirely independent from the Protestant Theology College of Cluj-Napoca and changed its name to Partium Christian University. It presently operates with 12 faculties and a student body of 1400; the language of instruction is Hungarian.

Architecture

Oradea's current architecture is a mix of Communist-era apartment buildings, mainly in the outer quarters, and beautiful historical buildings that are remnants of the era when the city was part of Austria-Hungary. In addition to many Baroque buildings, Oradea is remarkable for its particularly rich collection of Art Nouveau architecture.

Art Nouveau is easy to discern because of its curved, undulating lines " flowing " naturally, in syncopate rhythms, as a musical leitmotif. The numerous open curved lines – parabolas and hyperbolas – important elements of Art Nouveau "panoply", give dynamism and rhythm to these buildings and artefacts.

It is fully expressed in decorative arts, design, and architecture. The main ornamental characteristic is the asymmetric undulating line, terminated by an energetic whiplash.

Oradea may be considered one of the most representative centres of 1900 architecture in Romania; it can be compared with those of Secession architecture in Central Europe.

Located at the Romanian western border, Nagyvárad (to be changed to Oradea after the Treaty of Trianon) had been part of the Hungarian Kingdom, and was, until the Treaty of Trianon in 1921, part of the Central European Austro-Hungarian Empire and, thus, was influenced by the artistic currents of this space.

The buildings of the early 20th century are richly marked by Lechner and Vienna Secession influence, inheriting an important legacy from the great architects of the artistic movement of the late 19th century and the early 20th century. The architecture and habitat of Oradea are to be approached only in the context of Central European architecture.

By its independence and personality, Oradea has a place among the large great European families of the firmly contoured 1900 Art, especially regarding the area between the Citadel and the Main Railway Station.  There are here rental buildings, (Moskovits Palace I and II, Apollo Palace, Stern Palace, Adorján Houses I and II, Darvasy Palace), villas (La Roche, Vágó, Okany Schwartz), hotels (Pannonia, Emke, Rimonoczy, Weiszlovics, Fekete Sas / Vulturul Negru), military buildings – on Armatei Române Street, industrial buildings and warehouses (beer-, spirit-, bricks-factories, electric plant's chimney), public institutions (City Hall, Palace of Orthodox Bishopry, Palace of Greek-Catholic Bishopry, Palace of Justice, banks, houses of commerce and industry etc.), signed by architects who have a prime place in the European 1900 Architecture record: Odon Lechner, Dezső Jakab, Marcell Komor, László and József Vágó, Valér Mende, Ferenc Sztaril, Ferenc Löbl, Kálmán Rimanóczy Sr.and Jr., Anton Szallerbek.  All these sites offer a very diverse research and development material.
These great architects brought in Nagyvárad (Oradea) the influence of Vienna and Budapest through their work, featuring a new style, different from the academic ones, thus creating the premises of a stylistic diversification based on inventions and originality.

Like many European cities, "Small Paris", as Oradea was named at the beginning of the last century, has a belle-époque charm given by its Secession, eclectic, New-Romanian, Neoclassic and Baroque architecture. Not impressing by size or opulence, the buildings of Oradea have an aura of welfare, refinement and quality that imprints on the memory.
The early 20th century is well represented in the centre, but almost every zone of the city has something especially particular.
The history centre of the city has a great historical, cultural, architectural and urban planning heritage value. It includes settlements nuclei, architectural relics, monuments of architecture and urban planning beginning with the 16th century up to a well represented beginning of the 20th century, and none of the monuments are annoying or discordant.

Analyzing the unity of style and ornamentation as an intrinsic value of Art Nouveau, we can find a coherent style combining the architectural structure and its artistic means; stucco mouldings, statues and medallions, ironwork, stained glass, opaque and coloured glass – they all justify ornamentation as a principle of architecture, based on the value of the line, on the organic power of the plant and on the structural symbol.
Oradea architecture is a result of the values created by an extremely interesting and valuable ethnic mix, which materialized in a value exchange of a rare richness, and in a shared heritage of great majesty and beauty. In its evident and rare specificity, it appears to be exceptionally valuable.
The heritage represents here a unifying element, a social cohesion instrument, which engendered a cultural mosaic and an original synthesis, like the dialects of a language – the result is a stylistic dialect resulting from mutual embellishments and fertilizations.

This contribution, a Romanian stylistic intervention in an important European current, is worth a special attention and a significant promotion, to match the quality, generosity, authenticity and exceptional value of the harmonious resulting interlacing.

The authenticity of the place was very well kept and fed by the previous generations. If the local specificity is not well-preserved, much of the cultural identity, so important in identifying a people, will be lost.
The entire community must feel obliged to a greater attention and sensitivity concerning the heritage protection, and the authorities and experts must develop policies and actions to preserve such a valuable heritage.
It is necessary to study and know the different views of conservation, to carefully choose the appropriate ones, to avoid possible pitfalls that may stem from trying to maintain a balance between conservation and management of the historic city.

Tourist attractions

The old city centre is one of the main tourist highlights in Oradea, as are the Băile Felix health spas, accessible by bus and located just outside the city.

Other sites that attract a considerable number of tourists include:

 Baroque Palace of Oradea – today Muzeul Țării Crișurilor. It was the Roman Catholic bishop's palace until 1945, when the Communist regime took the building into public ownership. It was returned to the Roman Catholic Church in 2003. Its collection includes many fossils of dinosaurs and birds from the bauxite mines at Cornet-Brusturi.
Roman Catholic Basilica-Cathedral of the Assumption of Mary, or simply "Baroque Cathedral" ("Catedrala barocă") – the largest Baroque cathedral in Romania, and home to a skull relic and 2 statutes of St. King Ladislaus I of Hungary.
 Cetatea Oradea – Oradea's Fortress, with a pentagonal shape, is a fortification with walls of rock on some portions and wood towers situated at the gate and at the corners.
 Biserica cu Lună – a church with an astronomical clock depicting the phases of the moon, a unique feature in Europe.
 Pasajul Vulturul Negru – the "Black Eagle Palace" (or "Eagle Palace") shopping galleria, named after its famous stained glass eagle in the ceiling.
 Ady Endre Museum – a museum dedicated to one of the greatest Hungarian poets and a former resident of Oradea.
 Teatrul de Stat Oradea – the Oradea State Theatre (also known as the Queen Mary Theatre, or Teatrul Regina Maria) on Ferdinand Square in the heart of the city, completed in 1900.
 Strada Republicii – regarded as one of the most beautiful streets of Transylvania, it displays a great number of Art Nouveau buildings.
 Some 100 religious sites of different denominations in Oradea, including three synagogues (only one still in use) and the largest Baptist church in Eastern Europe, Emmanuel Baptist Church.

Sports

CSM Oradea is Oradea's professional basketball club that plays in the country's 1st division, Liga Națională, competition that the club won it, in 2016 and 2018, also competing in international competitions such as Champions League. The team plays its home matches at the Arena Antonio Alexe.

FC Bihor, founded in 1958, club colors were red and blue, and the logo includes the year 1902, when the first football match was played in Oradea in Réday Park, was the city's most representative club in the Romanian football system for 58 years, the club was dissolved in 2016, after important financial problems. A phoenix club appeared in 2022, under the same name FC Bihor Oradea

CA Oradea (CAO), founded in 1910 became famous, after the annexation of Northern Transylvania by Hungary during WW II, the football club played in the Hungarian Championship under the Hungarian translation Nagyváradi Atlétikai Club (NAC), and won the championship at the end of the 1943–1944 season. CA Oradea is one of only three football clubs who played and won national championships in three countries (the other two are SK Rapid Wien and Derry City). After FC Bihor dissolution CAO was refounded in the spring of 2017, at 54 years after its dissolution. In the late years another club appeared on the city's football stage, Luceafărul Oradea, club that was founded in 2001 and now is playing in the Liga II, being the most representative football club of the city and Bihor County, at this moment.

Many important footballers were born in Oradea over time, such as: Iuliu Baratky, Cosmin Bărcăuan, Elemér Berkessy, Zeno Bundea, Zoltan Crișan, Claudiu Keșerü, Attila Kun, Erik Lincar, Marius Popa, Paul Popovici, Francisc Spielmann, Albert Ströck, and Ion Zare.

CSM Digi Oradea is Oradea's professional water polo club, it evolves in the Romanian Superliga, competition that it won 9 times in a row and also have a regular presence in LEN Champions League or LEN Euro Cup, being a finalist in the last one.

International relations

Oradea is twinned with:

Metropolitan area

Oradea metropolitan area is a metropolitan area located in Western Romania, in the County of Bihor, Crişana Romania and was founded on 9 May 2005.

The metropolitan area comprises the city of Oradea and 8 adjacent communes:
Biharia
Borş
Cetariu
Nojorid
Oşorhei
Paleu
Sânmartin
Sântandrei.

Gallery

Notable people

Those born in Oradea
 Péter Pázmány (1570–1637), philosopher, theologian, cardinal.
 Sigismund Báthory (1572–1613), prince of Transylvania.
 Gabriel Báthory (1589–1613), prince of Transylvania
 Francis Rhédey (1610–1667), prince of Transylvania
 Ödön Beöthy (1796–1854), Hungarian deputy and orator.
 Emanoil Gojdu (1802–1870), lawyer
 József Nagysándor (1803–1849), honvéd general in the Hungarian Army
 Ede Szigligeti (1814–1878), playwright.
 Antal Csengery, (1822-1880), publicist and historical writer.
 Kálmán Tisza (1830–1902) the Hungarian prime minister between 1875 and 1890.
 Lucreția Suciu-Rudow (1859–1900), poetess
 Lajos Bíró (1880-1948), novelist, playwright and screenwriter
 Lajos Jambor (1884–1954), painter, muralist, illustrator
 Ernő Tibor (1885–1945), Impressionist and Neo-Impressionist painter
 Ernő Grünbaum (1908–1945), Expressionist painter
 Iuliu Baratky (1910–1962), footballer
 Francisc Spielmann (1916-1974), footballer
 Nándor Wagner (1922-1997), sculptor
 János Kristófi (1925-2014), painter
 Ovidiu Cotruș (1926–1977), essayist and literary critic 
 Mircea Zaciu (1928–2000), critic and literary historian 
 Titus Popovici (1930–1994), screenwriter
 Eva Heyman (1931–1944), Jewish girl, often compared to Anne Frank because of the diary she kept
 Iosif Demian (b. 1941), cinematographer and film director
 A. G. Weinberger (b. 1965), musician and radio producer
 Cosmin Bărcăuan (b. 1978), football player
 Erik Lincar (b. 1978), football player and manager
 Kálmán Kádár (b. 1979), water polo player
 Mihai Neșu (b. 1983), football player
 Gabriella Szűcs (b. 1984), handball player
 Claudiu Keșerü (b. 1986), football player

Those who lived in Oradea

 Roger of Torre Maggiore (1205–1266), Italian monk
 John Vitéz (1408–1472), bishop and humanist, he established in Oradea the first observatory from Southeast Europe
 George Martinuzzi (1482–1551), Bishop of Nagyvárad.
 Michael Haydn (1737–1806), Austrian composer
 Ignațiu Darabant (1738–1805), Eparchy of Oradea Mare bishop
 Carl Ditters von Dittersdorf (1739–1799), Austrian composer and violinist.
 Wenzel Pichl (1741–1805), Czech composer
 Samuil Vulcan (1758–1839), Eparchy of Oradea Mare bishop
 Mihail Pavel (1827–1902), Eparchy of Oradea Mare bishop
 Iosif Vulcan (1841–1907), magazine editor, poet, playwright, novelist 
 Roman Ciorogariu (1852–1936), Romanian Orthodox bishop
 Demetriu Radu (1861–1920), Eparchy of Oradea Mare bishop
 Valeriu Traian Frențiu (1875–1952), Eparchy of Oradea Mare bishop
 Endre Ady (1877–1919), Hungarian poet
 Alex Leon (1907-1944), painter
 Iuliu Bodola (1912–1992), football player
 Emerich Jenei (n. 1937), former football player and coach
 Alexandru Darie (1959–2019), theatre director
 Antonio Alexe (1969–2005), basketball player

Royalty buried in Oradea
 Ladislaus I of Hungary (1040-1095).
 Stephen II of Hungary (1101-1131)
 Andrew II of Hungary (1175-1235).
 Fenenna of Kuyavia (1276-1295)
 Beatrice of Luxembourg (1305-1319)
 Mary, Queen of Hungary (1371-1395)
 Sigismund, Holy Roman Emperor (1368-1437).

See also
 Diocese of Oradea (disambiguation)
 History of Oradea
 Timeline of Oradea

Sources

References

External links

 
 Oradea Town Hall 
 
 

 
Populated places in Bihor County
Localities in Crișana
Cities in Romania
Capitals of Romanian counties
Shtetls
Hungary–Romania border crossings
Historic Jewish communities in Europe
Place names of Hungarian origin in Romania
Art Nouveau architecture in Romania
Holocaust locations in Romania